Ronald Servius (born February 21, 1976 in Thionville, France) is a French athlete who specialises in the long jump. Servius competed at the 2000 Summer Olympics

References
 Sports Reference

External links
 

Olympic athletes of France
French male long jumpers
Athletes (track and field) at the 2000 Summer Olympics
1976 births
Living people
People from Thionville
Sportspeople from Moselle (department)
21st-century French people